Loyer is a French surname. Notable people with the surname include:

Emmanuelle Loyer (born 1968), French historian
Erik Loyer, American digital artist
John Loyer (born 1964), American basketball coach
Roger Loyer (1907–1988), French motorcycle road racer 

French-language surnames